John Francis Campbell (Scottish Gaelic: Iain Frangan Caimbeul; Islay, 29 December 1821 – Cannes, 17 February 1885), also known as Young John of Islay (Scottish Gaelic: Iain Òg Ìle) was a Scottish author and scholar who specialised in Celtic studies, considered an authority on the subject.

Early life 
John Francis Campbell was born on Islay on 29 December 1821 to Lady Eleanor Charteris (1796–1832), eldest daughter of Francis Wemyss Charteris Douglas, and Walter Frederick Campbell of Islay (1798–1855), MP for Argyll. Campbell was a descendant (great-great-great-grandson) of Daniel Campbell of Shawfield who had bought Islay from the Campells of Cawdor, for £12,000 in 1726.

Campbell was his father's heir, but creditors forced the island of Islay into administration, and the family left in 1847. After his father's death he was known as Campbell of Islay, even though the island had by then been sold.

Education and early career 
Campbell was educated at Eton and the University of Edinburgh.

He was called to the bar at the Inner Temple 1851, and appointed private secretary to the Lord Privy Seal in 1853. He was assistant secretary to the General Board of Health in 1854, he became secretary to the Trinity House Royal Commission of Lighthouses in London 1859. In 1861 he was Groom of the Privy Chamber.

Celtic studies 
Campbell was known as an authority on Celtic folklore and of the Gaelic peoples.

His most well-known published work is the bilingual Popular Tales of the West Highlands (4 vols., 1860–62)

He dedicated Popular Tales of the West Highlands to the son of my Chief, the Marquess of Lorne.

In 1872 he self-published Leabhar na Feinne, a collection of heroic ballads culled from manuscripts held by libraries, but to his chagrin this endeavor failed to meet with success.

He travelled extensively throughout the Scottish Highlands and Islands with his scribes, scrupulously recording West Highland tales, Fenian ballads, songs, charms and anecdotes.

He was proficient in Gaelic, Danish, Norwegian, Swedish, Lapp, Italian, Spanish and German. He travelled extensively, especially in Europe and Scandinavia. In 1874 he embarked on a year-long world tour that took him to America, Japan, China, Java, Ceylon and India.

The Celtic Dragon Myth was published posthumously in 1911. Campbell had started preliminary work on The Celtic Dragon Myth in 1862, and work intensified on it from 1870 until 1884. After Campbell's death in 1885 the noted Gaelic scholar George Henderson contributed some translation work, provided an introduction, and completed the editing of the manuscript for its eventual publication in 1911.

Inventions 
Campbell held a lifelong interest in the sciences, especially geology and meteorology. He invented the meteorological sunshine recorder or thermograph that bears his name as the Campbell–Stokes recorder.

Visit to Japan 
Campbell was acquainted with Colin Alexander McVean,  a Scottish engineer hired by Japan's Public Works as chief surveyor, and visited sights around Tokyo with McVean at the end of 1874, including Nikko. During the observation of the Venus transit by the Meiji government on 9 December 1874, he superintended a theodolite on the Gotenyama Hill site in Tokyo. He travelled through the central part of Honshu to Kyoto, then left Japan from Kobe in February 1875. He bought Japanese antiques and showed them in London to friends including Frank Dillion.

Later life 
He is buried under a replica of Islay's treasured Kildalton Cross in the Grand Jas Cemetery (le cimetière "du Grand Jas") at Cannes.

Campbell never married.

References
Citations

Bibliography

External links

A Short Biography of John Francis Campbell
An Article on John Francis Campbell's Life
Monument in Islay erected for John Francis Campbell

1822 births
1885 deaths
Collectors of fairy tales
19th-century Scottish writers
People from Islay
Scottish Gaelic language
Translators from Scottish Gaelic
19th-century British translators
People educated at Eton College
Alumni of the University of Edinburgh
Scottish lawyers
Scottish folk-song collectors
Scottish folklorists
 
19th-century musicologists